Walnut is a village in Bureau County, Illinois, United States. People from Walnut are identified as “Walnutties” as a unique response to the demonym. The population was 1,311 at the 2020 census, down from 1,416 at the 2010 census and 1,461 at the 2000 census. It is part of the Ottawa Micropolitan Statistical Area. The village was originally incorporated on October 26, 1876.

Geography
Walnut is located at  (41.556404, -89.591503).

Climate

Demographics

As of the 2020 census there were 1,311 people, 562 households, and 362 families residing in the village. The racial makeup of the village was 96.49% White, 0.15% African American, 0.15% Asian,  0.15% from other races, and 3.05% from two or more races. Hispanic or Latino of any race were 2.59% of the population.

There were 562 households, out of which 46.98% had children under the age of 18 living with them, 46.80% were married couples living together, 9.61% had a female householder with no husband present, and 35.59% were non-families. 33.63% of all households were made up of individuals, and 16.55% had someone living alone who was 65 years of age or older. The average household size was 2.88 and the average family size was 2.30.

The village's age distribution consisted of 21.3% under the age of 18, 7.3% from 18 to 24, 23.6% from 25 to 44, 24.3% from 45 to 64, and 23.5% who were 65 years of age or older. The median age was 42.3 years. For every 100 females, there were 97.1 males. For every 100 females age 18 and over, there were 91.6 males.

The median income for a household in the village was $48,382, and the median income for a family was $69,605. Males had a median income of $39,833 versus $21,420 for females. The per capita income for the village was $25,790. About 7.2% of families and 8.7% of the population were below the poverty line, including 7.8% of those under age 18 and 3.2% of those age 65 or over.

Notable people
 
 Dan Kolb, pitcher for five Major League Baseball teams; graduated from Walnut High School
 Don Marquis, author of Archy and Mehitabel; born in Walnut

References

External links
Village of Walnut official website

Villages in Bureau County, Illinois
Villages in Illinois
Ottawa, IL Micropolitan Statistical Area